Raja Mukherjee (17 May 1951 – 18 July 2022) was an Indian cricketer. He played 34 first-class matches for Bengal between 1967 and 1979. His highest score was 154 not out against Orissa. 

He was not related to Robin Mukherjee, who also played for Bengal in the late 1960s. They opened the batting together in 1967–68, making 112 for the first wicket in their first partnership.

References

External links 
 

1951 births
2022 deaths
Indian cricketers
Bengal cricketers
Cricketers from Kolkata